John Hutchinson may refer to:

Arts 
John Hutchinson (writer) (1674–1737), English theologian and natural philosopher
John Hutchinson, board operator for American radio program The David Lee Roth Show
John Hutchinson, member of American singing group Hutchinson Family Singers
Johnny Hutchinson (born 1940), British drummer
John 'Hutch' Hutchinson (1944-2021), British guitarist with David Bowie bands, between 1966 and 1973

Sciences 
John Hutchinson (botanist) (1884–1972), English botanist
John Hutchinson (surgeon) (1811–1861), surgeon and inventor of spirometer
John Irwin Hutchinson (1867–1935), American mathematician
John W. Hutchinson (born 1939), American professor of engineering at Harvard University

Sports 
John Hutchinson (footballer, born 1979), Australian-Maltese footballer
John Hutchinson (Australian rules footballer) (born 1936), Australian rules footballer

Politics 
John Hutchinson (secretary), territorial secretary, namesake of Hutchinson County, South Dakota
John Dyson Hutchinson (1822–1882), British Member of Parliament for Halifax, 1877–1882
John G. Hutchinson (born 1935), U.S. Representative from West Virginia, 1980–1981
John Hely-Hutchinson, 2nd Earl of Donoughmore (1757-1832), Anglo-Irish politician, peer and soldier

Other 
John Hutchinson (Roundhead) (1615–1664), leader in the 17th-century Puritan revolt in Britain
John Hutchinson (industrialist) (1825–1865), established the first chemical factory in Widnes, England
John Hutchinson (academic) (born 1949), British academic in the Department of Government at the London School of Economics
John Hutchinson (bishop) (1837–1897), Roman Catholic priest in Queensland, Australia

See also
John Hely-Hutchinson (disambiguation)
John Hutcheson (disambiguation)
John Hutchison (disambiguation)
Jonathan Hutchinson (1828–1913), English doctor
Jack Hutchinson (1880–1949), Australian rules footballer